Ben Bu Şarkıyı Sana Yazdım (I Wrote This Song for You) is the first album by Cem Adrian. It was released on February 14, 2005 by Imaj Music.

Track listing
 "Ben Bu Şarkıyı Sana Yazdım" - 5:07
 "Aspiration" - 3:11
 "Bana Özel" - 5:29
 "Kimler Geldi Kimler Geçti" - 3:53
 "Harbe Giden Sarı Saçlı Çocuk" - 3:00
 "Hayat... Ben..." - 4:54
 "Edirne Hatırası" - 3:17
 "Cluster" - 2:34
 "Merdivenler" - 4:19
 "Cem Session" - 5:34
 "Summertime" - 5:14
 "Uzun İnce Bir Yoldayım" - 3:50

2005 albums
Cem Adrian albums